Dayton Historic District is a national historic district located at Dayton, Rockingham County, Virginia, USA. The district encompasses 154 contributing buildings and one contributing site in the central business district and surrounding residential areas of the town of Dayton.  It includes a variety of residential, commercial, and institutional buildings most of which date from the late-19th century and early-20th century. Notable buildings include the Alberta Coffman House, Layman House, the Samuel Shrum House, the Thomas
House, W.J. Franklin House, Bank of Dayton (1911), the Ruebush-Kieffer Printing Company, Dayton Drug Company, Howe Memorial Hall, the Administration Building (1910), the Kieffer Alumni Gymnasium (1930), Carpenter Store (1888), Specialty Harness Company, Ruebush-Kieffer Company, and the Methodist, Presbyterian, and United Brethren churches.

It was listed on the National Register of Historic Places in 1984.

References

Historic districts in Rockingham County, Virginia
Victorian architecture in Virginia
National Register of Historic Places in Rockingham County, Virginia
Historic districts on the National Register of Historic Places in Virginia